KRMC (91.7 FM) is a Spanish language Christian radio station licensed to Douglas, Arizona. KRMC is owned by World Radio Network, Inc.

References

External links
 KRMC website
 

RMC
RMC
Radio stations established in 1997